In Case of Emergency, Release Raptor is an action video game from developer Arcen Games. The game puts the player in charge of a velociraptor with the goal of causing destruction in a 3D environment.

References

External links
 Official site

Action video games
2016 video games
Dinosaurs in video games
Linux games
MacOS games
Video games developed in the United States
Windows games